Quincy is an unincorporated community in Lewis County, Kentucky, United States. Quincy has a post office with ZIP code 41166.

References

Unincorporated communities in Lewis County, Kentucky
Unincorporated communities in Kentucky
Kentucky populated places on the Ohio River